Energy Networks Association may refer to:
 Energy Networks Association (Australia), the national body in Australia for companies that maintain energy networks
 Energy Networks Association (United Kingdom), the trade association in the United Kingdom for companies that maintain electricity transmission and distribution networks